Scarabaeus sanctus, is a species of dung beetle found in India, and Sri Lanka.

Description
This broadly oval species has an average length of about 21 to 26 mm. Body dark blue, green or coppery. Ventrum and legs nearly black. Head, legs, and lateral sides of the thorax covered with black hair. Dorsum shiny, and strongly punctured. Head coarsely, densely, and rugosely pitted. There are erect short hairs upon the clypeus. Pronotum moderately convex and densely asperately punctured or granular. Scutellum is visible. Elytra finely striate, with coarse intervals. Lateral sides of the metasternum very finely and sparingly punctured.

References

Scarabaeinae
Insects of Sri Lanka
Insects of India
Insects described in 1798